Lake St. Peter is a small lake in Ontario in Hastings Highlands, near the village of the same name.

See also
List of lakes in Ontario

Notes

Lakes of Hastings County